Fuyao Glass Industry Group Co., Ltd. is a manufacturing company in the People's Republic of China, engaged in the production of float glass, automobile glass and construction glass. It is one of the largest auto glass producers in the world, with customers including large international automobile manufacturers such as Ford, General Motors, Subaru, and Volkswagen Group. It was established in 1987 as a joint venture company and is headquartered in Fuqing, Fujian. It was listed on the Shanghai Stock Exchange in 1993 and on the Hong Kong Stock Exchange in 2015.

History 
Cao Dewang founded Fuyao in Fuqing, Fujian Province 1987 with several business partners. He had previous experience having taken over management of a glass factory owned by a local government. While there were few major buyers of automobiles at first, his company targeted the market of replacement glass for large numbers of imported vehicles into China. The name derives from the first character in the name of the city of Fuqing (福 fú) and the Chinese word meaning "shine" (耀 yào).

The company formed a joint venture with Saint-Gobain in 1996 with the French firm's 51 percent stake valued at $15.3 million. Three years later, Cao bought the stake back for $30 million.

Fuyao became an original equipment manufacturer to General Motors in June 2006. Later that year, it signed an agreement with Goldman Sachs to sell 111 million new shares, to raise about ¥890 million ($137 million). In March 2007, Fuyao landed a contract supplying Bentley. That year, foreign sales contributed ¥5.17 billion, or almost $795 million, almost 28 percent of its sales that year. By that time, it was the fifth-largest maker of automotive glass in the world, with an estimated three percent market share, and held 60 percent market share of the automotive glass market in China.

Fuyao Glass America Inc. 
In 2014, Fuyao began looking at establishing a factory presence in the United States, considering several sites in Ohio and Michigan before deciding on the former General Motors Moraine Assembly plant in Moraine, Ohio. Its initial commitment to the factory, which was made public in January 2014, was to buy 1.4 million square feet of the plant from Industrial Realty Group and invest $240 million into an auto glass production facility, which would create 800 jobs. In 2014, the company bought a float glass plant in Mount Zion, Illinois. In 2016, it announced an additional $131 million investment to add additional after-market glass lines at the plant, bringing it to 24 production lines. In exchange it received $6.6 million in incentives from JobsOhio. By then, the company planned to produce enough auto glass for 4 million to 5 million automobiles a year, taking advantage of the recent contraction in the U.S. auto market during the Great Recession. By the time the plant entered full-scale production in October 2016, it had invested $1 billion in the U.S. subsidiary. It has long-term plans to grow to 5,000 employees in the United States. As of early 2020, Fuyao had opened additional operating facilities in Greenville, South Carolina and Detroit, Michigan. By 2018, after losing tens of millions of dollars per year, the plant turned its first annual profit.

Worker relations 
The plant saw some obstacles during the first two years of operation within the United States, including concerns about safety, inability to turn a profit, and politicizing employee concerns regarding the unionization of the Moraine Assembly plant's labor force. Conflicts arose from clashes in cultural norms and customs between the Chinese and American employees within the Moraine assembly.

Shortly after the Moraine Assembly opened, it was cited by the Occupational Safety and Health Administration (OSHA) for several critical safety violations, including the failure to provide protective equipment, the lack of HAZMAT training, and the failure to properly cover moving machinery. The infractions violated the Occupational Safety and Health Act (United States) of 1970, which prevents employers from knowingly exposing employees to hazardous work conditions. OSHA cited Fuyao for thirteen safety violations and fined it approximately $725,000. Subsequently, Fuyao invested $7 million in safety features throughout the Moraine Assembly plant. Fuyao also formed an environmental safety team within the Moraine assembly to provide in-depth training to the plant employees in both English and Mandarin Chinese.

Since the majority of the labor force at Fuyao Glass America's Moraine Assembly plant had previously worked at the General Motors Moraine Assembly that was located on the same property, many workers wished to reform their connections with a major American labor union. A large portion of the plant's workforce organized and launched a campaign to form a union through the United Auto Workers, but company management promoted anti-union policies, hired anti-union organization contractors LRI to dissuade voters, and threatened union organizers with termination. In 2017 a union vote was held and anti-unionists defeated pro-unionists by 886 to 441 votes.

Following management's victory, several prominent employees in favour of trade unions and plant executives faced workplace repercussions ranging from losses in working hours to termination. Three pro-union employees, who had been terminated for reasons considered questionable by American cultural workplace standards, filed cases with the National Labor Relations Board (NLRB) against the company, which settled the case in 2018 by agreeing to cover back pay and interest totaling $120,000.  The settlement referenced the cases of four former employees, with allegations that included terminating workers, interrogating, harassing, and disciplining employees, refusing to hire employees with prior union ties, and constant changing of the company's terms and conditions of employment.

In 2016, Fuyao Glass America President John Gauthier and Vice President Dave Burrows were terminated, with Fuyao's executive management citing the need to improve company efficiency. Burrows and Gauthier filed suit with the Equal Employment Opportunity Commission, alleging that both executives were removed of both contract and employment without cause, prior notice, or explanation. The suit also alleged that national origin was a defining factor that Fuyao considered when firing both corporate executives. In 2020, Burrows was replaced by Sunny Yiqun Sun, a Chinese national.

In January 2019, American Factory premiered at the Sundance Film Festival, featuring themes of cultural conflict, production challenges and management opposition to unionization. The film won the Academy Award for best documentary. Critic Eric Kohn described it as "a fascinating tragicomedy about the incompatibility of American and Chinese industries."

References

Citations

Books

External links
Fuyao Group

Companies listed on the Shanghai Stock Exchange
Companies listed on the Hong Kong Stock Exchange
Glassmaking companies of China
Companies established in 1987
Companies based in Fuzhou
Chinese brands
Fuqing